Bailie Hugh Blackburn (2 July 1823, Craigflower, Torryburn, Fife – 9 October 1909, Roshven, Inverness-shire) was a Scottish mathematician. A lifelong friend of William Thomson (later Lord Kelvin), and the husband of illustrator Jemima Blackburn, he was professor of mathematics at the University of Glasgow from 1849 to 1879. He succeeded Thomson's father James in the Chair of Mathematics.

Life

Hugh Blackburn was brought up at Killearn House, Stirlingshire, the seventh of eight children of the wealthy Glasgow merchant John Blackburn and his wife Rebecca Leslie Gillies, the daughter of a Church of Scotland minister, and a relative of Colin Maclaurin. His elder brother was the judge Colin Blackburn, Baron Blackburn. His father, John, became wealthy off sugar and slavery in Jamaica, becoming a merchant on his return to Glasgow. In the 1830s, when the British government emancipated the slaves, John received compensation for the ownership of over 550 slaves.

Hugh was educated at the Edinburgh Academy and Eton before entering Trinity College, Cambridge in 1840. There he met Thomson, who entered in the same year; he was also a member of the Cambridge Apostles. During this time he invented the Blackburn pendulum. In the Mathematical Tripos examinations of 1845 he graduated fifth wrangler, while Thomson graduated second wrangler.

He entered the Inner Temple in 1847, but was never called to the Bar; his name was withdrawn in 1849, the year in which he became Professor of Mathematics at the University of Glasgow.

He married Jemima Wedderburn (cousin of James Clerk Maxwell), the daughter of James Wedderburn, Solicitor-General for Scotland.

Works
A treatise on trigonometry, London, 1855. Part of the Encyclopedia Metropolitana.
A short sketch of the constitutional history of the University of Glasgow and of Glasgow College in that University : with remarks on the Universities (Scotland) Bill, 1858
(ed. with William Thomson ) Sir Isaac Newton's Principia, 1871
Elements of plane trigonometry for the use of the junior class of mathematics in the University of Glasgow, 1871

References

External links
 
 

Scottish mathematicians
People from Torryburn
Alumni of Trinity College, Cambridge
Fellows of Trinity College, Cambridge
Academics of the University of Glasgow
Scottish inventors
1823 births
1909 deaths
People educated at Edinburgh Academy
People educated at Eton College